The 2015 German Open Grand Prix Gold was the Third grand prix gold and grand prix tournament of the 2015 BWF Grand Prix and Grand Prix Gold. The tournament was held in RWE-Sporthalle, Mulheim an der Ruhr, Germany from February 24 until March 1, 2015 and had a total purse of $120,000.

Men's singles

Seeds

  Jan Ø. Jørgensen (champion)
  Son Wan-ho (semi-final)
  Chou Tien-chen (third round)
  Hans-Kristian Vittinghus (quarter-final)
  Tommy Sugiarto (withdrew)
  Kento Momota (withdrew)
  Marc Zwiebler (withdrew)
  Sho Sasaki (quarter-final)
  Tanongsak Saensomboonsuk (first round)
  Lee Dong-keun (third round)
  Rajiv Ouseph (withdrew)
  Wei Nan (first round)
  Hsu Jen-hao (first round)
  Takuma Ueda (second round)
  Brice Leverdez (first round)
  Wong Wing Ki (semi-final)

Finals

Top half

Section 1

Section 2

Section 3

Section 4

Bottom half

Section 5

Section 6

Section 7

Section 8

Women's singles

Seeds

  Sung Ji-hyun (champion)
  Carolina Marín (final)
  Bae Yeon-ju (quarter-final)
  Zhang Beiwen (quarter-final)
  Sayaka Takahashi (semi-final)
  Michelle Li (second round)
  Akane Yamaguchi (first round)
  Minatsu Mitani (quarter-final)

Finals

Top half

Section 1

Section 2

Bottom half

Section 3

Section 4

Men's doubles

Seeds

  Lee Sheng-mu / Tsai Chia-hsin (quarter-final)
  Hiroyuki Endo / Kenichi Hayakawa (semi-final)
  Hirokatsu Hashimoto / Noriyasu Hirata (quarter-final)
  Mads Conrad-Petersen / Mads Pieler Kolding (champion)
  Kim Ki-jung / Kim Sa-rang (quarter-final)
  Vladimir Ivanov / Ivan Sozonov (final)
  Takeshi Kamura / Keigo Sonoda (second round)
  Michael Fuchs / Johannes Schöttler (withdrew)

Finals

Top half

Section 1

Section 2

Bottom half

Section 3

Section 4

Women's doubles

Seeds

  Misaki Matsutomo / Ayaka Takahashi (second round)
  Christinna Pedersen / Kamilla Rytter Juhl (champion)
  Nitya Krishinda Maheswari / Greysia Polii (second round)
  Lee So-hee / Shin Seung-chan (quarter-final)
  Eefje Muskens / Selena Piek (quarter-final)
  Shizuka Matsuo / Mami Naito (second round)
  Pia Zebadiah  / Rizki Amelia Pradipta (withdrew)
  Vivian Hoo Kah Mun / Woon Khe Wei (semi-final)

Finals

Top half

Section 1

Section 2

Bottom half

Section 3

Section 4

Mixed doubles

Seeds

  Joachim Fischer Nielsen / Christinna Pedersen (final)
  Ko Sung-hyun / Kim Ha-na (first round)
  Chris Adcock / Gabrielle Adcock (semi-final)
  Michael Fuchs / Birgit Michels (quarter-final)
  Sudket Prapakamol / Saralee Thoungthongkam (first round)
  Mads Pieler Kolding / Kamilla Rytter Juhl (champion)
  Danny Bawa Chrisnanta / Vanessa Neo Yu Yan (withdrew)
  Lee Chun Hei / Chau Hoi Wah (first round)

Finals

Top half

Section 1

Section 2

Bottom half

Section 3

Section 4

References
http://bwf.tournamentsoftware.com/sport/tournament.aspx?id=19A76ABB-4E06-4B9A-B398-555205B7748B

German Open (badminton)
BWF Grand Prix Gold and Grand Prix
German Open
Open
Sport in Mülheim